Sor Vorapin (stylized as S.Vorapin or S.Warrapin) is a Muaythai and professional boxing gym based in Bangkok, Thailand.

History 
This gym was established in 1979 by the couple Surapon and Vorapin Rungsikulpipat (สุรพล และ วรพิน รังษีกุลพิพัฒน์) to promote Muaythai. Later, Ratchasak Sor Vorapin (ราชศักดิ์ ส.วรพิน); fighters in Thailand often use the last name of their gym) was the first fighter of this gym. He won in three weight classes, the championships of Rajadamnern Stadium and Lumpinee Stadium (Junior bantamweight–115 lbs, Junior featherweight–122 lbs, Featherweight–126 lbs). It created a reputation for the gym.

Ratanapol Sor Vorapin (รัตนพล ส.วรพิน) won the IBF Mini flyweight (105 lbs) world title on December 10, 1992 at Nimibutr Stadium inside National Stadium, Bangkok. He won the championship twice and retained the title 20 times. Later, Ratanapol's younger brother, Ratanachai Sor Vorapin (รัตนชัย ส.วรพิน) won the WBO Bantamweight (118 lbs) world title on May 7, 2004 with a unanimous decision win over a Mexican boxer, Cruz Carbajal in Nakhon Ratchasima province. Their two younger brothers, Kaichon Sor Vorapin (ไก่ชน ส.วรพิน) and  Kosol Sor Vorapin (โกศล ส.วรพิน) are boxers there.

It originally had two branches are Bang Lamphu near Khao San Road and Wat Chana Songkhram, Phra Nakhon side and Soi Suan Phak 1, Taling Chan District, Thonburi side. But now the  Bang Lamphu branch has closed, only the branch is left at Taling Chan and there are no fighters competing in the name of the gym anymore. The gym is reduced to only a sporting club that trains Muaythai to those who are interested only.

References

External links
Official website 
Official facebook 

Kickboxing training facilities
Boxing gyms
1979 establishments in Thailand
Muay Thai
Kickboxing in Thailand